State Highway 103 (SH 103)  is a state highway that runs through east Texas from an intersection with SH 7 near the Neches River through Lufkin to an intersection with SH 21 near the Louisiana state border.  The route was originally designated in 1926.

Route description
SH 103 begins at an intersection with SH 7 just east of the Neches River.  It then travels generally eastward to the western outskirts of Lufkin.  The route then briefly travels northeast along State Loop 287 and US Route 69 before entering Lufkin coinciding with the business route of US 69.  At Atkinson Drive, it turns east and proceeds out of town. It crosses two arms of Lake Sam Rayburn before reaching its eastern terminus at SH 21 just west of Milam, and 10 miles from the Louisiana border.  The entire route covers 63.05 miles.

History

SH 103 was originally designated on February 17, 1925 from Centerville east through Crockett to Lufkin, and SH 103 was conditional on location and construction. On March 28, 1927, another SH 103 was created as a renumbering of SH 104 from Ranger to Morton Valley (as it was unsure if the other SH 103 would be built). This SH 103 was eliminated by 1930. As a result, there was only one SH 103 from Centerville east through Crockett to Lufkin. On December 1, 1930, SH 103 was cancelled. SH 103 was restored on January 22, 1931. By 1933, the route had only been built between Crockett and Ratcliff, and was only an improved earth road. On July 15, 1935, only the already constructed section from Crockett to Ratcliff remained. The section from Ratcliff to Lufkin was restored on February 25, 1937. On September 26, 1939, the western section from Crockett to Ratcliff was reassigned to SH 7. On October 30, 1939, before signage was changed, SH 103 was extended east to Milam, replacing SH 293 (note that SH 103 was to be taken over by SH 293 on September 26, 1939). By 1940, sections around Lufkin were completed, but did not connect to earthen roads to the west. On January 22, 1940, the section of SH 103 from Ratcliff to the Neches River was cancelled. On March 26, 1942, SH 102 was extended west 3.5 miles from the Neches River. On September 14, 1944, SH 103 was extended west to Ratcliff. On June 14, 1961, SH 103 was truncated to rerouted SH 7, which was built along a new route and part of cancelled FM 327 (the rest of FM 327 became part of FM 1819). On June 21, 1990, one small section of SH 103 from Loop 287 to Business US 59 was transferred to Business US 69.

A spur route, SH 103A, was designated on January 23, 1939 from Lufkin to Milam. On September 26, 1939, SH 103A was renumbered as SH 293.

Major intersections

References

103
Transportation in Angelina County, Texas
Transportation in Nacogdoches County, Texas
Transportation in San Augustine County, Texas
Transportation in Sabine County, Texas